Amicrotrichomma is a genus of bristle flies in the family Tachinidae. There are at least two described species in Amicrotrichomma.

Species
These two species belong to the genus Amicrotrichomma:
 Amicrotrichomma ada Curran, 1947 c g
 Amicrotrichomma orbitalis Townsend, 1927 c g
Data sources: i = ITIS, c = Catalogue of Life, g = GBIF, b = Bugguide.net

References

Further reading

External links

 
 

Tachinidae